The Aggressive-class minesweepers are a class of US-built minesweepers. They are designated as MSO (Mine Sweeper Ocean), distinguishing them from the smaller coastal MSCs and inshore MSIs. Besides the US Navy, this class of vessels has also been used by the Belgian Navy and the Norwegian Navy, among others.

Background
Minesweeping, or the disposal of naval mines, by these vessels is performed in different ways:
Sweeping proper, with an underwater cable cutting the mooring cables of moored mines. The mines then come to the surface and are destroyed by gunfire.
Acoustic sweeping, with a towed device producing noise to trigger acoustic mines.
Magnetic sweeping, with a towed device producing a magnetic field to trigger magnetic mines. To protect the minesweeper itself against magnetic mines, the hull and superstructure of the ship are made of wood. Other components are made of non-magnetic materials, and any magnetic materials are strictly controlled.

Construction and disposition
Of the 53 constructed for the United States Navy, 10 were built at Higgins Corp., New Orleans, Louisiana, 9 at J.M. Martinac Shipbuilding Corp., Tacoma, Washington, 8 at Wilmington Boat Works Inc., Wilmington, California, 6 at Luders Marine Construction Co. of Stamford, Connecticut, 4 at Broward Marine Inc, Fort Lauderdale, Florida, 4 at Martinolich Shipbuilding Co., San Diego, California, 3 at Burger Boat Company, Manitowoc, Wisconsin, 3 at Colberg Boat Works, Stockton, California, 2 at Fulton Shipyard, Antioch, California, 2 at Norfolk Naval Shipyard and 2 at Seattle Shipbuilding and Drydocking Co., Seattle, Washington.

33 of the class were decommissioned before the mid-1970s. Four ex-USN ships were sold to the Republic of China Navy 1994 and re-classed as s. They were still in active service in 2012.  was decommissioned 30 September 1994 in Tacoma, Washington and was the last Aggressive-class minesweeper in US Navy active service.

Units

See also
 HNLMS Onverschrokken (M886) - Dutch Aggressive-class minesweeper

References

External links

FAS - MSO-422 class
GlobalSecurity - MSO-422 class
ex MSO 483

 
Mine warfare vessel classes